Grey Abbey is a ruined Franciscan abbey in County Kildare, Ireland. Founded in 1260, the Kildare poems were likely written in the abbey.

History
The abbey was founded in 1260 by William de Vesci, however it was completed by Maurice FitzGerald, Lord of Offaly. Gerald FitzGerald, 5th Earl of Kildare was buried here.

A manuscript which is the original source of the Kildare poems was likely written in the Grey Abbey in the early 1300s.

References

Notes

Sources 

Religion in County Kildare
Former religious buildings and structures in the Republic of Ireland
Ruins in the Republic of Ireland
Christian monasteries established in the 13th century
Franciscan monasteries in the Republic of Ireland
1260 establishments in Ireland
Burial sites of the FitzGerald dynasty